The 1947 UK & Ireland Greyhound Racing Year was the 22nd year of greyhound racing in the United Kingdom and Ireland.

Roll of honour

Summary
Racing was seriously affected by the Winter of 1946–47 in the United Kingdom and the fuel crisis. Tracks were forced to close from 11 February and on 11 February Sir Guy Bower, a Department Secretary for the Government, had closed down all greyhound tracks to conserve fuel and when racing was allowed to return it was restricted to Saturdays. On 15 March the fuel ban was lifted after 29 days, but 160 meetings were lost in London alone.

Despite the loss of nearly two months of racing the returns for the year were significant, the extraordinary year of 1946 would never be matched again but totalisator returns still reached £131,460,177. The government increased their tote tax deduction to 10%, earning over £13 million for the treasury, track deductions remained at 6%. The government was subject to criticism from the industry because of the view that it was being treated harshly and unfairly in regard to tax, despite the fact that the excess profit tax had been removed in January 1947.

Trev's Perfection won the triple crown (the English Greyhound Derby, Scottish Greyhound Derby and Welsh Greyhound Derby) becoming the first greyhound in history to achieve this.

Tracks
Oxford's Managing Director Leslie Calcutt was appointed as Director of Bristol Greyhound Racing Association Ltd. Wembley under the leadership of Arthur Elvin announces significant profits of £610,000 of which £343,000 was taken by the government in tax.

Tracks opened

Competitions
Motts Regret reached the Wandsworth Spring Stakes final where he finished second to Balmaha, which attracted the attention of Fred Trevillion, a haulage contractor from Dartford in Kent, who was also a licensed greyhound trainer with a number of greyhounds in his kennels carrying the 'Trev's' prefix. He paid £900 to purchase Motts Regret and changed the dogs name to Trev's Perfection. His first race as Trev's Perfection was on 22 March at White City beating Parish Model and then he won the Circuit at Walthamstow Stadium. Trevillion also bought Jackie and renamed him Trev's Jackie, the blue dog had been favourite for the Easter Cup but was subsequently pulled out of the event by Trevillion.

Mondays News back from winter rest, headed for the Gold Collar at Catford Stadium and after winning a heat he would meet Trev's Perfection for the first time in the semi-finals. Mondays News continued his fine form, setting a new track record in that semi-final but a reverse of fortunes in the final saw Trev's Perfection win his first classic race. He would then go on to record the historic Triple Crown.

The Scurry Gold Cup went to the consistent Rimmells Black; he had been the runner up in the same event twelve months before. One month later the Laurels crown also went the way of Rimmells Black, despite a strong final that included Slaney Record, Tonycus and Mondays News now under the charge of Sidney Orton. Dante II, now trained by Bob Burls impressed, when winning the St Leger by eight lengths at his home track and Mondays News became the Grand Prix champion. The final field had included Priceless Border who finished second at odds on and Patsys Record. Trev's Perfection had lost his unbeaten run in the semi-finals and went to stud for the time being.

News
An outbreak of disease rapidly swept the country and many litters were wiped out, veterinary surgeon Paddy Sweeney stated that this particular fever is nearly always fatal. The condition was sometimes known as hard pad disease but soon better known as distemper and there was no vaccine in 1947. The National Greyhound Racing Society, the business arm of the National Greyhound Racing Club (NGRC), donated £70,000 over a five-year period to the Veterinary Educational Trust.

On 21 February, at Temple Mills Stadium a meeting is held in daylight, without using any electricity. The hare is powered by two men on a tandem, with two relief pedallers on standby. Government officials are present and satisfied that the entire meeting is run without the use of electricity.

Eastville Stadium instigated a wide search for a greyhound called Mountford Quiver after she escaped from the track kennels, the bitch returned of her own accord 16 days later in good condition despite a harsh winter. The NGRC introduced a rule that owners of bitches that come into season must inform them.

A film featuring greyhound racing scenes at Clapton Stadium and White City Stadium is released, the film is called The Turners of Prospect Road and is criticised by sectors of the greyhound industry for stereotypical portrayal of greyhound racing.

Wimbledon introduced race specific perforated tote tickets in order to combat forged tickets.

Ireland
Kilcohan Park in Waterford raced for the first time under Irish Coursing Club rules. Shelbourne Park track specialist Daring Flash, sired by the great Tanist and trained by Mary D'Arcy won the 1947 Irish Greyhound Derby.

The Northern Irish Parliament issues new legislation banning Sunday racing and also makes an order that will change the status of Northern Ireland tracks to the present day. They decide that any racing in Northern Ireland should come under the Irish Coursing Club which leaves the tracks in limbo because they would receive no funding or support from either the National Greyhound Racing Club or the Bord na gCon.

Principal UK races

+Track Record

Totalisator Returns

The totalisator returns declared to the licensing authorities for the year 1947 are listed below. Tracks that did not have a totalisator in operation are not listed.

Summary

+ number of tracks include those without a tote in operation

References 

Greyhound racing in the United Kingdom
Greyhound racing in the Republic of Ireland
UK and Ireland Greyhound Racing Year
UK and Ireland Greyhound Racing Year
UK and Ireland Greyhound Racing Year
UK and Ireland Greyhound Racing Year